Bérengère is a feminine name in the French language.

People with the given name 

Bérangère Abba (born 1976), French politician
Bérangère Couillard (born 1986), French politician
Bérengère Dautun (born 1939), French actress
 Bérengère Krief (born 1983), French actress and comedienne
 Bérangère Nau (born 1977), French former ice dancer
 Bérengère Poletti (born 1959), French politician and Member of the National Assembly
 Bérengère Schuh (born 1984), French archer

See also 

 Berengaria (disambiguation)

References 

Given names
French feminine given names